Marjorie Anne McQuade (born 16 July 1934), later known by her married name Marjorie Bennett, is a former competition swimmer who represented Australia at the 1948 Summer Olympics in London and the 1952 Summer Olympics in Helsinki.

At the 1950 British Empire Games in Auckland, New Zealand, McQuade was one of the standout performers for Australia, winning three gold medals. Individually, she won the women's 110-yard freestyle, and was a member of the winning Australian women's teams in the 4×110-yard freestyle relay and the 3×110-yard medley relay.

McQuade attended St Michael's School in St Kilda, Victoria. She is one of the St Michael's "notable alumni" and an "Old Michaelian". Her husband Peter Bennett was an Australian rules footballer and competed for Australia in water polo at the 1952 Olympics.

References

1934 births
Living people
Australian female freestyle swimmers
Olympic swimmers of Australia
Swimmers at the 1948 Summer Olympics
Swimmers at the 1952 Summer Olympics
Swimmers at the 1950 British Empire Games
Commonwealth Games medallists in swimming
Commonwealth Games gold medallists for Australia
Swimmers from Melbourne
20th-century Australian women
Medallists at the 1950 British Empire Games